Sanje ya Kati Island or Kati Island is an island located in Pande Mikoma ward in Kilwa District in Lindi Region of Tanzania's Indian Ocean coast. The island is home to a medieval Swahili ruin of Sanje ya Kati. The Island is the ancestral home of the Machinga people.

References

 Islands of Lindi Region
 Islands of Tanzania